The Sperry UFO case was a sighting of an Unidentified Flying Object by the captain, Willis Sperry, and other crew of an American Airlines DC-6 airborne near Mount Vernon, Maryland on 29 May 1950.

Media exposure of the case helped to establish a popular perception of UFOs being reported by "credible" witnesses such as airline pilots; Sperry was interviewed for several newspapers and was later featured in Clarence Greene's 1956 semi-documentary film Unidentified Flying Objects: The true story of flying saucers.

The sighting

Sperry's aircraft had left Washington Airport at 9:10 pm EST on a flight to Nashville and was climbing to 20,000 ft. Weather conditions were clear, with the ground obscured by haze, and a full moon around 25° above the horizon. At approximately 9:30pm, seven miles west of Mount Vernon, copilot W. Gates alerted Sperry to a bright blue or bluish light ahead of them and increasing in size. In a letter to Flying magazine several months later, Sperry described the light as "a brilliant, diffused, bluish light of fluorescent type [...] 25 times the magnitude of the brightest star". To avert a possible collision, Sperry banked the aircraft and changed course 45° to the right; the light appeared to stop before changing course to parallel the aircraft on the left.

During this period the light very briefly passed between the aircraft and the upper part of the moon, revealing an object with a long silhouette (somewhat reminiscent of a submarine) without visible wings or empennage. In his 1950 letter, Sperry stated the blue light was on the front of the object, which was also seen by the copilot and by flight engineer R. Arnholt.

The object having appeared to pass behind the left wing, the pilots banked to the left and resumed their previous course, but Gates spotted the light again through the right window "as though it had circled behind them". The light then appeared to head eastwards behind the aircraft, and was observed again by Sperry towards the rear left travelling in the direction of the Atlantic; he estimated the total time of observation as around one minute, during which time the light had appeared to be completely stationary at least twice.

Sperry reported his observations to Washington control tower, but they had observed nothing on radar. He also spoke to his passengers, stating that one man had seen an "extremely bright light passing the left side of the ship".

Later interviews

Apart from newspaper interviews immediately following the sighting, the press having been notified by control tower staff, and his appearance in the 1956 film (where the case was featured alongside the Mantell Incident, Gorman Dogfight and others considered unexplained at the time), Sperry was also interviewed by KABC-TV in 1964. He and Arnholt were further interviewed in 1968 by the prominent ufologist Dr James E. McDonald.

Sperry later learned that Hank Myers, subsequently pilot of President Harry S. Truman's plane, had been piloting another Washington-bound AAA aircraft between Nashville and Knoxville on the same night, and had witnessed a bright meteor which fell eastward from the zenith, but which then appeared to move horizontally for several seconds. Comparing times and the relative position of his aircraft with that of Myers, Sperry felt that this was possibly the same phenomenon or object as he saw. Both he and Gates, the copilot, had however "emphatically discounted" the possibility of the phenomenon being a meteor, due to its movements.

See also

Edward J. Ruppelt
The case bears some surface resemblance to the Chiles-Whitted UFO Encounter, an incident which had a strong influence on the development of popular perceptions of UFOs.

References

Accidents and incidents involving the Douglas DC-6
Alleged UFO-related aviation incidents
1950 in Maryland